Adam Heidt (born October 11, 1977) is an American luger. He competed at the 1998 Winter Olympics and the 2002 Winter Olympics.

References

External links
 

1977 births
Living people
American male lugers
Olympic lugers of the United States
Lugers at the 1998 Winter Olympics
Lugers at the 2002 Winter Olympics
People from Huntington, New York